Trinidad State College is a public community college in Trinidad, Colorado. It was founded in 1925, making it the first community college in the state of Colorado. Trinidad State operates a satellite campus in the nearby city of Alamosa, Colorado. The college offers 49 degree programs in vocational fields.

Academics
TSC offers courses in many diverse areas, including gunsmithing, aquaculture, cosmetology, welding, nursing, as well as traditional arts and STEM subjects such as English, biology, and chemistry. Additionally, TSC trains first-responders with both an affiliated Emergency medical services training center in Grand Junction, Colorado, and its own on-campus Peace Officer Standards and Training program.

Trinidad State has been continually accredited by the Higher Learning Commission since 1962.

Athletics
As a member of the NJCAA, Trinidad State College offers 11 athletic programs, including:
 Baseball
 Men's Basketball
 Women's Basketball
 Men's Cross Country
 Women's Cross Country
 Men's Indoor/Outdoor Track & Field,
 Women's Indoor/Outdoor Track & Field
 Men's Soccer
 Women's Soccer
 Softball
 Volleyball

Name change
On May 18, 2021, Colorado's governor signed a law officially changing the college's name from Trinidad State Junior College to Trinidad State College.

Notable alumni
 Franklin Clarke, former All-Pro player for the Dallas Cowboys
 Mark Grudzielanek, former professional baseball player All-Star with teams including the Montreal Expos and the Los Angeles Dodgers
 Spencer Haywood, Olympic gold medalist, professional basketball player, and Naismith Memorial Basketball Hall of Fame inductee
 Gayle Hopkins, advanced to final round in the men's long jump at the 1964 Tokyo Summer Olympics
 Danny Jackson, former two-time baseball National League All-Star
 Cody Jones, former football player for the Los Angeles Rams
 Kimmi Lewis, rancher and politician
Devonte Upson (born 1993), basketball player in the Israeli Basketball Premier League
 Larry Walton, former football player for the Detroit Lions
 Gary Weaver, former football player for the Green Bay Packers

References

External links
 Official website

 
Colorado Community College System
Buildings and structures in Alamosa County, Colorado
Buildings and structures in Las Animas County, Colorado
Education in Alamosa County, Colorado
Education in Las Animas County, Colorado
NJCAA athletics
Educational institutions established in 1925
1925 establishments in Colorado